The 1963 NHL Amateur Draft was the first NHL Entry Draft. It was a draft to assign unaffiliated amateur junior-age players to NHL teams. It was held on June 5 at the Queen Elizabeth Hotel in Montreal, Quebec. It was the first amateur draft, which consisted of 16-year-old players.

The amateur draft was instituted by NHL President Clarence Campbell as a means of phasing out the sponsorship of amateur teams by the league's member clubs. The NHL wanted to create what Campbell called "a uniform opportunity for each team to acquire a star player".  Prior to the creation of the draft NHL teams would sponsor amateur teams and players, pre-empting other NHL clubs from acquiring new, young talent, and limiting amateur players' prospects in the NHL to the team which sponsored them.

Eligibility in this draft was limited to all amateur players who would reach 17 years of age between August 1, 1963, and July 31, 1964. Under the league rules, teams were not allowed to talk to the drafted players about turning professional until they turned 18. At that point, the teams had 72 hours to get the players signed or placed on their negotiation list. Players already on sponsorship lists were ineligible.

The draft order was determined by giving the teams choice of their place in the six-team order based on a reverse order of the standings, for example, as the Boston Bruins finished last in the 1962–63 season they were given first choice of pick in the order. The final draft order was chosen to be Montreal Canadiens, Detroit Red Wings, Boston Bruins, New York Rangers, Chicago Black Hawks and Toronto Maple Leafs. The order would rotate in the next draft such that each team moved up one spot in the order, and the first pick Canadiens would move to sixth.

This first draft consisted of four rounds, however few top prospects were available to the draft in the early years as most of hockey's top junior players had already been assigned to NHL clubs through sponsored junior teams. In the 1963 draft only 21 players, out of a possible 24 picks, were chosen. This is because teams were allowed to defer their pick to the next team in the draft order. The Red Wings chose not to exercise their third and fourth round picks, and the Black Hawks elected not to exercise their fourth round pick.

Of the players selected five eventually played in the NHL, and only one won the Stanley Cup (Peter Mahovlich). None of the players selected have been inducted into the Hockey Hall of Fame.

Selections by round
Below are listed the selections in the 1963 NHL amateur draft.

Round one

Round two

Round three

Round four

See also
 1963–64 NHL season
 List of NHL players

References

External links
 Facts about the 1963 draft on hockeydraftcentral.com
 1963 NHL Amateur Draft player stats at The Internet Hockey Database

Draft
National Hockey League Entry Draft